Dino Sebastian Agote Delgado (born 30 June 1996), is a Chilean footballer  who plays as a right back for Municipal Mejillones.

Club career
Dino did all lower in Universidad Católica but his debut was in Rangers de Talca.

External links

1996 births
Living people
Chilean footballers
C.D. Antofagasta footballers
Rangers de Talca footballers
Club Deportivo Universidad Católica footballers
Association football fullbacks
People from Antofagasta